Joana Isabel Ventura Ramos (born 16 January 1982) is a Portuguese judoka who competes in the women's 52 kg category. At the 2012 Summer Olympics, she was defeated in the second round.

In 2021, she competed in the women's 52 kg event at the 2020 Summer Olympics in Tokyo, Japan.

References

External links

 
 
 

1982 births
Living people
Sportspeople from Coimbra
Portuguese female judoka
Olympic judoka of Portugal
Judoka at the 2012 Summer Olympics
Judoka at the 2016 Summer Olympics
Judoka at the 2020 Summer Olympics
Judoka at the 2015 European Games
Judoka at the 2019 European Games
European Games bronze medalists for Portugal
European Games medalists in judo
20th-century Portuguese women
21st-century Portuguese women